Akshay Kapoor (born: Swapnil Gohil) (born 18 September 1980) is an Indian actor.

Biography
Akshay was born on 18 September 1980 in India and immigrated to the United States when he was 6 months old. He spent his childhood and teens in Pittsgrove, New Jersey and trained as a theatre actor having appeared in some Broadway plays. He has since tried his luck in Bollywood.

He made his Bollywood film debut with the teen romantic comedy, Popcorn Khao! Mast Ho Jao was released in 2004. In 2006, he starred in his second Bollywood film, Alag, a remake of the American film Powder. In it, he played the role of a man with extraordinary supernatural powers and with no hair on his entire body. Although both of the films failed at the box office, he got good reviews for his performances in both films.

He has also appeared in a Short film called A Beautiful Mind... of a Gladiator which is a spoof of the Oscar-winning films A Beautiful Mind and Gladiator. In 2009, he played a small role in Kal Kissne Dekha and played the lead in the thriller, Three and the dance film, Fast Forward.

Filmography

References

External links

Interview with Akshay Kapoor about his film Alag
Interview with Akshay Kapoor about his film debut

1980 births
 Living people
 American male film actors
 American male actors of Indian descent
 American male models of Indian descent
 Male actors from Mumbai